HD 175740 is a single star in the northern constellation of Lyra. This object has an orange hue and is dimly visible to the naked eye with an apparent visual magnitude of 5.46. It is located at a distance of approximately 266 light years from the Sun based on parallax, and has an absolute magnitude of 0.89.

This is an aging giant star with a stellar classification of K0III, having evolving off the main sequence after the supply of hydrogen at its core was exhausted. It is an estimated 4.78 billion years old with 1.39 times the mass of the Sun, although Bailer-Jones et al. (2018) give a higher estimate of 2.8 times the Sun's mass. The elemental composition of this star has made it the first giant to be a candidate solar sibling, suggesting it may have been born in the same star cluster as the Sun. It has expanded to ten times the girth of the Sun and is radiating 50 times the Sun's luminosity from its photosphere at an effective temperature of 4,811 K.

HD 175740 has a magnitude 12.6 visual companion, located at an angular separation of  along a position angle (PA) of 300°, as of 2013. A magnitude 11.5 companion lies at a separation of  along a PA of 39°, as of 2014. Both were discovered by American astronomer G. W. Hough in 1887.

References

K-type giants
Lyra (constellation)
Durchmusterung objects
175740
092831
7146